is a Japanese actress. She was given Best Supporting Actress awards at the 2004 and the 2009 Yokohama Film Festival ceremonies. She won the award for best supporting actress at the 32nd and at the 33rd Japan Academy Prize for Departures and Dear Doctor respectively.

Family
Yo was born in Yokohama, Kanagawa Prefecture. Her mother is Japanese and her father, who moved to Japan for business and later founded the Hakka Association in Japan, is Hakka Taiwanese.

Filmography

Films
Chōchin (1987)
A Sign Days (1989)
Hiruko the Goblin (1991)
Yumeji (1991)
Evil Dead Trap 3: Broken Love Killer (1993)
Ghost Pub (1994)
Sharaku (1995)
School Ghost Stories (1995)
Moonlight Serenade (1997)
Wait and See (1998)
Tsuribaka Nisshi Eleven (2000)
New Battles Without Honor and Humanity (2000)
Suicide Club (2002)
Aiki (2002)
Café Lumière (2003)
Drugstore Girl (2004)
Tokyo Tower (2005)
Break Through! (2005)
Yamato (2005)
Virgin Snow (2007)
The Ramen Girl (2008)
Departures (2008)
Air Doll (2009)
Dear Doctor (2009)
Villain (2010)
The Lone Scalpel (2010)
Rebirth (2011)
Hoshi Mamoru Inu (2011)
Tsure ga Utsu ni Narimashite (2011)
Dirty Hearts (2011)
Bread of Happiness (2012)
Ace Attorney (2012)
Gaiji Keisatsu (2012)
Ai to Makoto (2012)
Anata e (2012)
Shield of Straw (2013)
A Story of Yonosuke (2013)
Parasyte: Part 1 (2014)
Shinya Shokudō (2015)
A Stitch of Life (2015), Hiroe Minami
Shin Godzilla (2016)
Black Widow Business (2016)
Midnight Diner: Tokyo Stories (2016)
Perfect Revolution (2017)
Ringside Story (2017)
Sleep in the Shadows (2019), Akiho Yoshimura
Show Me the Way to the Station (2019)
AI Amok (2020)
Step (2020)
Shape of Red (2020)
Any Crybabies Around? (2020)
Hotel Royal (2020)
Peaceful Death (2021)
First Gentleman (2021), Takako Sōma
Noise (2022)
A Winter Rose (2022), Michiko
Everything Will Be Owlright! (2022), Minoshima
 To Every You I've Loved Before (2022), old Kazune (voice)
 To Me, The One Who Loved You (2022), old Kazune (voice)
 Mentai Piriri 2023 (2023), Tsuru Yoshida

Television
Atsuhime (2008), Fusahime
Half Blue Sky (2018), Kimika Okada
Innocent Days (2018)
Kuroido Goroshi (2018), Tsuneko Raisen
The Naked Director (2019)
The Fugitive (2020), Hanae Yonemoto

Honours
Medal with Purple Ribbon (2019)

References

External links

Official agency profile 

1956 births
Actresses from Yokohama
Japanese film actresses
Japanese television actresses
Living people
Recipients of the Medal with Purple Ribbon
20th-century Japanese actresses
21st-century Japanese actresses